At the 1928 Winter Olympics in St. Moritz, four speed skating events were scheduled, all for men, but medals were only awarded for three events, because the 10.000 m event was not completed. The Allround event, which was only organized in 1924, was removed from the program. The competitions were held on Monday, 13 February 1928 and on Tuesday, 14 February 1928.

In the 10,000-meter race, Irving Jaffee was leading the competition, having outskated Norwegian defending world champion Bernt Evensen in their heat, when rising temperatures thawed the ice.  In a controversial ruling, the Norwegian referee canceled the entire competition. Although the International Olympic Committee reversed the referee's decision and awarded Jaffee the gold medal, the International Skating Union later overruled the IOC and restored the ruling. Evensen, for his part, publicly said that Jaffee should be awarded the gold medal, but that never happened.

Medal summary

Participating nations

A total of 40 speed skaters from 14 nations competed at the St. Moritz Games:

Medal table

References

External links
International Olympic Committee results database
 

 
1928 Winter Olympics events
1928
Olympics, 1928